The Iran Football League Organization is a national sports association responsible for administering the five professional football leagues in Iran - the Persian Gulf Pro League, Azadegan League, 2nd Division, 3rd Division and Kowsar Women Football league. The association also administrates the Hazfi Cup, Iran's domestic cup competition. The organisation was founded in 2001.

Competition

President

The President, along with the other members of the Executive Committee, is responsible for the day-to-day running of the organisation. The current acting president is Reza Keshvari.

See also
 Iranian football league system
 Football Federation Islamic Republic of Iran

Notes

References

External links
 

Persian Gulf Pro League
Azadegan League
League 2 (Iran)
League 3 (Iran)
Hazfi Cup